The T 6 of the Prussian State Railways were a class of twelve passenger tank locomotives. They were intended as an alternative to the Prussian T 11 and T 12 classes on the routes of the Berlin Stadt (city), Ring and suburban network. A total of twelve locomotives were built in 1902 by Berliner Maschinenbau AG. Two went to the Altona Division, the other ten to the Berlin Division. The design was unusual  – being a three-cylinder design.  In comparison to the T 11 and T 12, they were the least economical of the three classes. They were also other technical reasons why no more T 6 locomotives were built.

The locomotives were later dispersed to other railway divisions. After World War I, five went to the Polish State Railways (PKP), who classified them as OKl1. The locomotives that remained in Germany were retired by the early 1920s

References 

2-6-2T locomotives
1′C1′ n3t locomotives
T 07
Berliner locomotives
Railway locomotives introduced in 1902
Standard gauge locomotives of Germany
Passenger locomotives